Kabsha is an album led by drummer Idris Muhammad recorded in 1980 and released on the Theresa label.

Reception

In his review for AllMusic, Scott Yanow stated: "Muhammad, who had often been heard in funky or more commercial settings, really excels in this sparse setting, showing off what he learned from hearing bands in his native New Orleans".

Track listing
All compositions by Idris Muhammed except where noted
 "Kabsha" - 8:45  
 "I Want To Talk About You" (Billy Eckstine) - 5:13  
 "Little Feet" (Ray Drummond) - 4:49  
 "GCCG Blues" (George Coleman) - 6:13  
 "Soulful Drums" (Jack McDuff, Joseph Thomas) - 4:41  
 "St. M" (Bill Fischer) - 6:14  
 "Kabsha" [Alternate Take] (Muhammad) - 8:00 Bonus track on CD reissue  
 "GCCG Blues" [Alternate Take] (Coleman) - 5:16 Bonus track on CD reissue

Personnel
Idris Muhammad - drums
George Coleman (tracks 1, 3, 4, 7 & 8), Pharoah Sanders (tracks 2, 4-6 & 8) - tenor saxophone 
Ray Drummond - bass

References

1980 albums
Idris Muhammad albums
Theresa Records albums
Albums recorded at Van Gelder Studio